John Smith was a Negro league outfielder in the 1940s.

Smith made his Negro leagues debut in 1940 with the Indianapolis Crawfords. He played for the Birmingham Black Barons in 1942, then spent three seasons with the Chicago American Giants, and finished his career with a three-season stint with the New York Black Yankees.

References

External links
 and Seamheads

Place of birth missing
Place of death missing
Year of birth missing
Year of death missing
Birmingham Black Barons players
Chicago American Giants players
New York Black Yankees players
Baseball outfielders